Shilaidaha Rabindra Kuthibari, in short Shilaidah Kuthibari, is one of the major tourist places in Bangladesh. It is located seven kilometers north of Kushtia on the banks of Padma in Kumarkhali Upazila of Kushtia District.

History

This Kuthi was built by a indigo-planter named Shelly which was later owned by Ramlochan Tagore. In 1807, Dwarkanath Tagore got the ownership of this kuthibari with the inheritance of estate. In 1892, due to the erosion of the river caused by the flood, the Kuthibari was likely to disappear, so it was demolished and a new building was constructed elsewhere in the next year. Dwarkanath Tagore's grandson Rabindranath Tagore came to Shilaidaha several times to look after the estate. He had the opportunity to stay in this cottage. He wrote many literatures during his stay at Shilaidah Kuthibari. During his stay here in 1912, he began the work of translating the Gitanjali into English. During his stay in this building in 1905, he wrote a song which is now the national anthem of Bangladesh.

Before its acquisition to the Government of East Bengal in 1947, the ownership of this Kuthibari was transferred from the Tagore family to another landlord. In 1958 it came under the Department of Archeology of Pakistan. In 1969, the provincial government planned to preserve it as an archaeological site. Since the independence of Bangladesh in 1971, it has been under the Department of Archeology of Bangladesh. In 2013, then President of India, Pranab Mukherjee visited Shilaidah Kuthibari. He then told the government that he wanted to provide financial assistance to build a complex at the Kuthibari site. After four years, the decision was finalized between the two countries and the construction of the complex was completed by 2020. In 2018, a dam was constructed to protect Shilaidah Rabindra Kuthibari, but a part of it collapsed in the same year. Later in 2022, another part of the dam collapsed.

Architecture
Shilidaha Kuthibari was built on 11 acre land of the village. This walled building is three storey museum that has 18 rooms with a central hall. There are a total of 17 doors for entering and exiting the 18 rooms. The building has a total of 30 windows to let in sunlight. The building has an area of 273.87 square meters. Built in Indo-Saracenic style, this building is 8.74 meters high.

Tourist attractions

Layout

There are two buildings near the gate of Kuthibari. The two buildings are named Gitanjali and Sonar Tori. There is a library, two ponds, a mango orchard, a garden and an auditorium.

Museum

In 1986, it became a museum. The Department of Archaeology has preserved at least 80 photographs of Rabindranath Tagore as well as items used by Rabindranath Tagore at Shilaidah Kuthibari.

Tourism

It is a tourist attraction for Bangladeshi as well as foreign tourists. A three-day event is organized every year on the occasion of Rabindranath Tagore's birth anniversary. In the fiscal year 2017-18, the Bangladeshi government earned  by selling entry tickets to the Kuthibari. However, the government refrained from organizing events here in 2020 and 2021 due to the COVID-19 pandemic.

In popular culture
The stall of the Department of Archeology set up at the 2022 Ekushey Book Fair was modeled after Rabindra Kuthibari.

Gallery

References

External link

Shilaidaha Kuthibari : Beautiful Bangladesh

Kushtia District
Tourist attractions in Bangladesh
Biographical museums in Bangladesh
Memorials to Rabindranath Tagore